Introducing the Eleventh House with Larry Coryell is the debut album by The Eleventh House, released in 1974 by Vanguard Records.

Track listing

Personnel
 Randy Brecker – French horn, trumpet
 Larry Coryell – guitar
 Mike Mandel – piano, synthesizer
 Danny Trifan – bass
 Alphonse Mouzon – drums, percussion

References

1974 debut albums
Larry Coryell albums
Vanguard Records albums